Andrés J. d'Alessio (17 April 1940 – 4 April 2009) was an Argentine academic, lawyer, and judge.  He was personally involved in the Trial of the Juntas.

References

1940 births
2009 deaths
20th-century Argentine judges
Argentine prosecutors
Argentine people of Italian descent
Lawyers from Buenos Aires